The Waimakariri River is one of the largest rivers in Canterbury, on the eastern coast of New Zealand's South Island.

The river rises on the eastern flanks of the Southern Alps, eight kilometres southwest of Arthur's Pass. For much of its upper reaches, the river is braided, with wide shingle beds. As the river approaches the Canterbury Plains, it passes through a belt of mountains, and is forced into a narrow canyon (the Waimakariri Gorge), before reverting to its braided form for its passage across the plains. It enters the Pacific north of Christchurch, near the town of Kaiapoi.

Instead of being unoccupied Crown land as are most New Zealand river beds, the bed of the Waimakariri River is vested in the Canterbury Regional Council (Environment Canterbury).

Name
The name Waimakariri comes from the Māori words wai, meaning water, and makariri, meaning cold. The river was briefly renamed as the Courtenay River in 1849 by the chief surveyor of the Canterbury Association, Joseph Thomas, in honour of Lord Courtenay. However, this name quickly fell into disuse in favour of the traditional Māori name. The Waimakariri is colloquially referred to as the 'Waimak', a shortening of the Māori name.

Geography
The source of the Waimakariri is located in the Southern Alps, at the head of a valley to the west of Arthur's Pass, where it is primarily fed by snow melt and glacial runoff. The river flows in a southerly direction, before turning east around the base of Mount Stewart. The river at this stage becomes braided, and is joined by the Bealey River as it flows across wide shingle beds.

As the river is joined by the Esk River, the Waimakariri river is forced into a narrow series of gorges and ceases being braided. This continues as the river flows through the foothills of the Southern Alps, and is used by the Midland Line railway as part of its traverse of the Southern Alps. The river exits the foothills at the Waimakariri Gorge, at which point it again expands to a braided system.

Once on the Canterbury Plains, the Waimakariri flows in a roughly east-south-easterly direction towards the Pacific Ocean. As with other braided river systems, the main channels frequently change within the primary riverbed, especially during periods of high flow rates. Geological evidence indicates that this mobility has extended to the river itself in the past, at times flowing through the current location of Christchurch into what is now the Avon Heathcote Estuary, and on a separate occasion flowing into Lake Ellesmere / Te Waihora, to the south of Banks Peninsula. To protect Christchurch and other settlements near the river, multiple flood protections have been constructed either side of the river since European settlement, dating as early as the Canterbury Rivers Act 1868.

The river currently reaches the Pacific Ocean just to the north of Christchurch, entering Pegasus Bay by way of Brooklands Lagoon. The Waimakariri marks one of only a few breaks in the roughly  length of Pegasus Bay. Along with two other rivers which enter Pegasus Bay (Ashley River / Rakahuri and Waipara River), the Waimakariri is almost entirely responsible for the sediment which forms the bay and its coastal plain.

Bridges

Due to the size of the river, only a limited number of bridges cross the Waimakariri. From upstream to downstream, the current bridges are:

Waimakariri Falls

This simple suspension bridge (a.k.a. as a three-wire bridge) is just downstream from the Waimakariri Falls located on a tramping track close to the Waimakariri Falls Hut.

Bealey Bridge

The Bealey Bridge is located immediately upstream from where the Bealey River flows into the Waimakariri. It is part of State Highway 73. Bealey Bridge is single-lane, with a passing bay in the middle. It is in a remote location and does not cater for pedestrians.

Midland Line bridge #42

KiwiRail records this bridge as number 42 on its bridge asset list. It is located where Red Beech Stream flows into the Waimakariri.

Mount White Bridge

It is much older than the Bealey Bridge. The abutment on the left bank of the Waimakariri is located within the delta created by the Hawdon River.

Waimakariri Gorge Bridge

This bridge was completed in 1877 and originally served both road and rail traffic (of the Oxford Branch). The bridge is on the register of Heritage New Zealand as a Category II structure.

SH1 Waimakariri Bridges

The SH1 Waimakariri Bridges are twin bridges connecting Christchurch with the region north of the Waimakariri River via State Highway 1. As part of the Christchurch Northern Motorway, each bridge was widened from two to three lanes during 2020, plus a cycleway added.

Main North Road bridge

This two-lane traffic bridge does not cater for walking or cycling.

Main North Line bridge #17

Immediately downstream from the Main North Road bridge, the Main North Line crosses the river. Kiwirail records this bridge as number 17 on its bridge asset list.

Ecology
As one of the largest rivers on the Canterbury plains, the Waimakariri is an important habitat for wildlife, including many endangered species of plants and animals. The dry sections of riverbed are home to black-fronted terns, where braids in the river provide a natural barrier to predators. The river and its tributaries are home to native species, including crayfish / kōura, New Zealand longfin eel, short-finned eel, lamprey and many species of invertebrates. The river is one of the few remaining habitats for the critically endangered Canterbury mudfish (kowaro), which previously inhabited wetlands across the Canterbury plains, while a portion of its riverbank is home to one of only two known remaining populations of Olearia adenocarpa.

Introduced fish are common along the entirety of the Waimakariri River, making the river a popular location for fishing. As with most of New Zealand, this primarily includes brown and rainbow trout, as well as Chinook salmon (Oncorhynchus tshawytscha). The salmon population dates to the early 1900s, when they were introduced from California, and results in large salmon runs near the river mouth in summer.

Development

In 1923 the river was mainly investigated for a hydroelectric dam to supply electricity to Christchurch. It received support from the community but the dam was never built since the Government offered inexpensive electricity from the Lake Coleridge scheme.

The Central Plains Water Trust is proposing to take  of water from two points on the Waimakariri River as part of the Central Plains Water enhancement scheme.

Pollution

In 2007 the Waimakariri was ranked as one of the ten most polluted of the larger rivers in New Zealand. Some of the pollution was caused by liquid wastes from industries such as a meat processing plant and wool scourers in the vicinity of the river. The wastes were discharged directly into it but as of 2012 it was piped to the municipal sewage treatment plant. There had been some non-compliance issues with the resource consents for water discharge.

References

External links

Waimakariri River Regional Plan at Environment Canterbury
The Waimakariri River as a water resource. Dalmer, 1971 

Hurunui District
Rivers of Canterbury, New Zealand
Braided rivers in New Zealand
Waimakariri District
Rivers of New Zealand